The  is a national expressway connecting Iida, Nagano and Hamamatsu. It is owned and operated by Ministry of Land, Infrastructure, Transport and Tourism and is signed National Route 474 as well as E69 under their "2016 Proposal for Realization of Expressway Numbering."

Junction list 
Toll gates are appended with TB instead of an exit number. There are currently no service areas.

|colspan="10" style="text-align:center; "| (Inasa Branch) through to

References

474
Expressways in Japan
Roads in Aichi Prefecture
Roads in Nagano Prefecture
Roads in Shizuoka Prefecture

ja:三遠南信自動車道#国道474号